Sarinh is a village in Ludhiana district of Punjab, India.

Geography 

See also 
Sarinh, Jalandhar
Buttar Sarinh

References 

Villages in Ludhiana district